The Head River is a river in the township of Ramara, Simcoe County and the city of Kawartha Lakes in Southern Ontario, Canada. It is in the Great Lakes Basin, and flows from Head Lake west to the Black River, east of Lake Couchiching. The Black River flows via the Severn River to Georgian Bay on Lake Huron.

See also
List of rivers of Ontario

References

Other map sources:

Rivers of Simcoe County
Rivers of Kawartha Lakes